El Greco is a Greek biographical film about the life of the Greek painter of the Spanish Renaissance, Domenicos Theotokopoulos, known worldwide as El Greco. Based on the fictionalized biographical novel, El Greco: o Zografos tou Theou (El Greco: the Painter of God), by Dimitris Siatopoulos, it was released in 2007, directed by Yannis Smaragdis and written by Jackie Pavlenko. The main cast features prominent contemporary Greek actors like Lakis Lazopoulos, Dimitra Matsouka and Dina Konsta, and includes popular actors of the Greek cinema of the 1960s such as Sotiris Moustakas and Katerina Helmi, who, along with Juan Diego Botto, Laia Marull and others, surround the leading actor, Nick Ashdon, who portrays El Greco.

Plot
The film tells a fictitious story of Domenicos Theotokopoulos, better known as El Greco, a great Greek artist of the 16th century with an uncompromising character, who sets off from his homeland Crete and goes to Venice and finally Toledo, in search of freedom and love. There he is confronted by his greatest adversary, the Spanish Inquisition, but his creative consciousness and power make him stand out and overcome barbarity and ignorance.

Being imprisoned and awaiting execution by the Spanish Inquisition, Domenicos (Nick Ashdon) writes out his story, thus parts of his life play out in extended flashbacks. Born on the island of Crete, which was at the time part of the Republic of Venice, he falls in love with Francesca (Dimitra Matsouka), daughter of the Venetian governor of Crete. But his father is preparing a political rebellion and as a result Domenicos leaves the island and moves to Venice, away from the young woman. There he meets the famous painter Titian (Sotiris Moustakas) and the Spanish priest Fernando Niño de Guevara (Juan Diego Botto). Guevara immediately shows a confused interest in Domenicos, and, when roiled by the Greek - and fighting personal demons - calls Domenicos before the Inquisition where he must defend himself against charges of heresy.
It must be emphasized that the entire story is fictional, El Greco was never prosecuted by the Inquisition, but got well paid assignments from high-rank Inquisition leaders, like Fernando Niño de Guevara, Grand Inquisitor of Spain from 1600 to 1602.

Cast
 Nick Ashdon as El Greco 
 Juan Diego Botto as Fernando Niño de Guevara
 Laia Marull as Jeronima de las Cuevas 
 Lakis Lazopoulos as Nicolos 
 Dimitra Matsouka as Francesca 
 † Sotiris Moustakas as Titian 
 Dina Konsta as Maid 
 Giorgos Christodoulou as Da Rimi 
 Dimitris Kallivokas as Chacon 
 Giorgos Charalampidis as Greco's father 
 Thodoris Zoumboulidis as Manousos 
 Lida Protopsalti as Carcadil's wife 
 Katerina Helmi as Spanish noble woman 
 Fermi Reixach as Don Miguel de las Cuevas 
 Roger Coma as Paravicino
 Constantinos Isaias as Orgaz

Soundtrack

An audio CD with the original soundtrack composed by Vangelis, El Greco Original Motion Picture Soundtrack, was released in Greece on December 20, 2007, by Universal Music Greece, only a few days after the international release of the 25th Anniversary edition of the Blade Runner soundtrack. It consists of 18 tracks, 15 of them composed by Vangelis while the other three involve source material from within the film. This is the third project by Vangelis regarding El Greco, following Foros Timis Ston Greco, an album released in 1995, and an expansion of it with three more tracks in 1998, titled El Greco.

Reception

Awards
Winner:

 2007: Greek State Film Awards for Best Film
 2007: Greek State Film Awards for Best Director (Yannis Smaragdis)
 2007: Greek State Film Awards for Best Cinematography (Aris Stavrou)
 2007: Greek State Film Awards for Best Editing (Yannis Tsitsopoulos)
 2007: Greek State Film Awards for Best Music (Vangelis)
 2007: Greek State Film Awards for Best Set Decoration
 2007: Greek State Film Awards for Best Sound
 2007: Greek State Film Awards for Best Make up
 2008: Cairo International Film Festival for Best Actor (Juan Diego Botto)
 2009: Goya Awards for Best Costumes Design

References

External links
 
 
 

2007 films
2000s historical films
2000s English-language films
English-language Greek films
English-language Spanish films
2000s Greek-language films
2000s Spanish-language films
Greek biographical films
Films set in the 16th century
Films set in Greece
Films set in Crete
Films set in Venice
Films set in Toledo, Spain
Films shot in Greece
Films shot in Crete
Cultural depictions of El Greco
Biographical films about painters
Films scored by Vangelis
2007 multilingual films
Greek multilingual films
Spanish multilingual films